WP is a Polish television channel, launched on 2 December 2016. The channel is owned by Wirtualna Polska Holding, owner of one of the largest Polish web portals, Wirtualna Polska.

Programming

Own production
 # (#) – current affairs program, hosted by Kamila Biedrzycka-Osica and Małgorzata Serafin
 # (#) – news program, hosted by Maciej Orłoś, Małgorzata Serafin, Marcin Antosiewicz, Michał Siegieda
 Pudelek Show – tabloid magazine, hosted by Małgorzata Tomaszewska and Bilguun Ariunbaatar

Series
 Orphan Black
 The Fall
 Death in Paradise
 Call the Midwife
 Parade's End 
 Mistresses
 Scott & Bailey
 Unreal
 The Bridge
 Catherine
 Prisoners of War
 Mujeres de negro

Reality shows
 Junior Doctors: Your Life in Their Hands
 Love It or List It

References

External links
  

Television channels and stations established in 2016